Frances Hesselbein (November 1, 1915 – December 11, 2022) was an American businesswoman and writer. She served as the CEO of the Girl Scouts of the USA, from 1976 to 1990, and the president and CEO of the Frances Hesselbein Leadership Forum, at the University of Pittsburgh Graduate School of Public and International Affairs (GSPIA), Johnson Institute for Responsible Leadership.

Career 
Hesselbein took classes at the University of Pittsburgh Johnstown Junior College in 1936.

Between 1965 and 1976, she rose from volunteer troop leader to CEO and held the position of CEO for thirteen years until 1990. During her tenure, the Girl Scouts attained a membership of 2.25 million girls with a workforce of 780,000, mainly volunteers.

In 1990, Hesselbein left the Girl Scouts to run the Leader to Leader Institute (formerly known as the Peter F. Drucker Foundation for Nonprofit Management). After Drucker's death in 2005, the foundation was renamed after Hesselbein in 2012; it is now known as the Frances Hesselbein Leadership Institute.

In 2009, she helped to found the Hesselbein Global Academy for Student Leadership and Civic Engagement at the University of Pittsburgh.

Hesselbein is the co-editor of 27 books published in 29 languages and the author of Hesselbein on Leadership and My Life in Leadership.

Hesselbein served on the boards of the Mutual of America Life Insurance Company, the Bright China Social Fund, California Institute of Advanced Management, and the Teachers College, Columbia University Presidents Advisory Council.

Awards
In 1998, Hesselbein was awarded the Presidential Medal of Freedom for her work with the Girl Scouts of the USA. She turned 100 years old in November 2015.

Hesselbein was denoted a Pitt Legacy Laureate of the University of Pittsburgh in 2000. She has received 22 honorary doctoral degrees.

Personal life 
Frances Hesselbein was married to John Hesselbein. She died at her home in Easton, Pennsylvania, on December 11, 2022, at the age of 107.

Publications

Author
 Hesselbein, Frances, foreword by Jim Collins, My Life in Leadership, 2011
 Hesselbein, Frances, and General Eric K. Shinseki, United States Army, Ret. Be, Know, Do: Leadership the Army Way, 2004
 Hesselbein, Frances, foreword by Jim Collins, Hesselbein on Leadership, 2002

Editor
 Hesselbein, Frances and Marshall Goldsmith, eds. The Organization of the Future 2: Visions, Strategies, and Insights on Managing in a New Era, 2009.

References

External links
 Frances Hesselbein Leadership Forum

1915 births
2022 deaths
People from Johnstown, Pennsylvania
American centenarians
Girl Scouts of the USA national leaders
University of Pittsburgh at Johnstown alumni
Presidential Medal of Freedom recipients
Women centenarians